Line of Duty is a British police procedural television series created by Jed Mercurio and produced by World Productions. On 26 June 2012, BBC Two began to broadcast the first series; it was its best-performing drama series in ten years with a consolidated audience of 4.1 million viewers. Broadcast of the second series began on 12 February 2014; its widespread public and critical acclaim led to the BBC commissioning a further two series. The third series began on 24 March 2016 on BBC Two; the following three series were broadcast on BBC One.

In May 2017, the BBC commissioned a sixth series. Filming began in February 2020 but stopped the following month due to the COVID-19 pandemic; it resumed in September. Filming continued until November 2020. Broadcast of the sixth series began on BBC One on 21 March 2021.

Prior to switching channels from series four onwards, Line of Duty was the most popular drama series broadcast on BBC Two and is a winner of the Royal Television Society Award and Broadcasting Press Guild Award for Best Drama Series. The Telegraph included it in a list of the Top 50 BBC Two shows of all time and in a list of the 80 best BBC shows of all time. In 2016, the series ranked eighth in The Independents list of the twenty greatest police shows of all time and third in a Radio Times 2018 poll of the best British crime dramas of all time. In 2021 Line of Duty won the National Television Award for Special Recognition.

Synopsis
Line of Duty follows DS Steve Arnott, an authorised firearms officer who is transferred to Anti-Corruption Unit 12 (AC-12) after refusing to agree to cover up an unlawful shooting by his own team. At AC-12 Arnott is partnered with DC Kate Fleming, a highly commended undercover officer with a keen investigative instinct. They work under the supervision of Superintendent Ted Hastings, uncovering corruption within the fictional Central Police. Throughout the series, AC-12 investigate seemingly disparate cases involving seemingly corrupt police officers such as DCI Tony Gates, DI Lindsay Denton, Sergeant Danny Waldron, DI Matthew Cottan, DCI Roseanne Huntley, undercover officer DS John Corbett and DCI Joanne Davidson.

AC-12 realises the pervasive nature of corruption and the police's deep-rooted links to an organised crime group. A long-running story arc revolves around discovering the identity of "H", a corrupt person or persons of senior rank within the police force who are instrumental in running organised crime.

Cast and characters

Main

Recurring

 Elliot Rosen (series 1) and Tommy Jessop (series 5–6) as Terry Boyle
 Tomi May as Miroslav Minkowicz (series 1, 5)
 Heather Craney as DCI Alice Prior (series 1)
 Lauren O'Rourke as Keely Pilkington (series 1)
 Marie Critchley as Jane Hargreaves (series 1)
 Alison Lintott as Rita Bennett (series 1)
 Claire Keelan as DS Leah Janson (series 1)
 Faraz Ayub as DC Deepak Kapoor (series 1)
 Fiona Boylan as PC Karen Larkin (series 1)
 Neet Mohan as PC Simon Bannerjee (series 1)
 Darren Morfitt as Sergeant Colin Brackley (series 1)
 Shaun Mason as Lee (series 1)
 Maria Connolly as Alison Merchant, corrupt prison officer (series 2, 5, 6)
 Steve Toussaint as CS Mallick (series 2)
 Sacha Dhawan as DS Manish Prasad (series 2)
 Richard Huw as Nick Robson (series 2)
 David Maybrick as Sergeant Alex Wallis (series 2)
 Allison McKenzie as DS Jayne Akers (series 2)
 Antonio Magro as PC Vincent Butler (series 2)
 Niall Macgregor as Richard Akers (series 2)
 Michael Nardone as Sergeant O'Neill (series 2)
 Chetna Pandya as New Jo (series 2)
 Henry Pettigrew as DC Jeremy Cole (series 2)
 Charlotte Spencer as Carly Kirk (series 2)
 Lisa Palfrey as Inspector Tracey McAndrew (series 3)
 Mandana Jones as Superintendent Summers (series 3)
 Patrick FitzSymons as DCI Mark Moffatt (series 4–5)
 Royce Pierreson as DC Jamie Desford (series 4)
 Claudia Jessie as DC Jodie Taylor (series 4)
 Mark Stobbart as DS Neil Twyler (series 4)
 Vineeta Rishi as FC Rupal Pandit (series 4)
 Gaite Jansen as Hana Reznikova (series 4)
 Scott Reid as Michael Farmer (series 4)
 Richard Pepple as Sergeant Kyle Ferringham (series 5)
 Maanuv Thiara as Vihaan Malhotra (series 5)
 Laura Elphinstone as DI Michelle Brandyce (series 5)
 Natalie Gavin as Sergeant Martina "Tina" Tranter (series 5)
 Kwaku Fortune as DS Marks (series 6)
 Sherise Blackman as PS Ruby Jones (series 6)
 Tara Divina as PC Lisa Patel (series 6)
 Sara Dylan as Boyle's solicitor (series 6)
 Kerri McLean as Deborah Devereux (series 6)
 James Nesbitt as Marcus Thurwell (series 6)

Episodes

Production

Line of Duty was created and written by Jed Mercurio drawing inspiration from the Metropolitan Police anti-corruption unit A10, which was set up in 1971. The first two series were produced by World Productions, on behalf of BBC Two. David Caffrey and Douglas Mackinnon directed series one. Mackinnon directed the first three episodes of series two and Daniel Nettheim directed the remaining three episodes. Mercurio produced series one and acted as executive producer for series two, with Peter Norris taking over as producer for the second series.

Although the police refused to co-operate with the programme's producers, the production team was advised anonymously by serving officers and retired police officers, and made use of anonymous police blogs.

Locations
Series one was filmed in Birmingham, including pub interiors in the Queen's Arms. The following five series were made in Northern Ireland. Although exact locations are never mentioned, maps of Birmingham appear on walls, and telephone numbers use an 0121 area code, again indicating Birmingham. The fictional 01632 phone code is also seen. Various postcodes seen on paper and screen have the Birmingham 'B' or Milton Keynes 'MK' prefix. The police forces referred to are the fictional Central Constabulary and the fictional East Midlands Constabulary. A photo gallery of exterior scenes from series two shows the 4th Street Station on Ormeau Avenue in Belfast. Many locations in Belfast have been used; the offices of Invest Northern Ireland on Bedford Street depict the exterior of AC-12's headquarters.

Awards and nominations

Home media
Kew Media (previously known as Content Media) handled international distribution of the series until its collapse in 2020.

DVD

DVD releases for Line of Duty

Blu-ray
Blu-ray releases for Line of Duty

Line of Duty got a series six Blu-ray release.

Line of Duty series one to six will be released in a compilation Blu-ray box set.

International broadcast
In Australia, as of 2021, the first five series are available across streaming services such as Britbox, Netflix, Acorn TV and Stan, but series six is exclusive to Britbox.

In the United States, the first series was released on Hulu in August 2012, as an exclusive series, until Acorn TV picked up the streaming rights for its platform in 2018, which included the existing series and exclusive access to series five and later additions. The first three series began airing on AMC on 4 April 2020. However, licence changes in 2021 led to BritBox also obtaining the rights to the series in the United States, along with exclusive rights to series six and any future series.

References

External links

Line of Duty, scripts at BBC TV Drama archive

2012 British television series debuts
2021 British television series endings
2010s British crime drama television series
2010s British police procedural television series
2010s British workplace drama television series
2020s British crime drama television series
2020s British police procedural television series
2020s British workplace drama television series
BBC crime drama television shows
British detective television series
British thriller television series
English-language television shows
Police corruption in fiction
Television series by ITV Studios
Television series by World Productions
Television productions postponed due to the COVID-19 pandemic
Television shows filmed in England
Television shows filmed in Northern Ireland
Television shows set in England